Sphingomonas trueperi is a Gram-negative soil bacterium.

External links
Type strain of Sphingomonas trueperi at BacDive -  the Bacterial Diversity Metadatabase

trueperi
Bacteria described in 1997